Mixobarbaroi ("semi-/mixed/half barbarians") was an ethnographical term first used in Classical Greece by authors to denote people who lived in the frontiers of the oikoumene, and had qualities of both the civilized peoples and the barbarians, as seen in the works of Euripides, Plato and Xenophon. It would later come to describe mixed Greeks or other people mixed with "barbarians" in the Greek lands of cultural plurality. 

In the Plato dialogue Menexenus, a group of "barbarians" considered themselves Greeks, but were not full-blooded Greeks, thus only "mixobarbaroi". Xenophon describes the people of Cedreiae in Asia Minor, who were allies to Athens, as "mixobarbaroi", meaning those who were bound to treaties with Athens but were not Athenian.

After the Christianization of the Byzantine Empire and the first Christian emperor Constantine I, the term is used to denote non-Romans of Christian faith living in the frontiers bound by treaties to the emperor, thus being of half-barbarian stock opposed to ordinary "barbarians" who were either non-civilized, pagan or not living in the frontiers.

In Byzantine times this term was used by authors chiefly in the 11th and 12th centuries to denote ethnically and linguistically mixed populations, such as those that existed in the Danume provinces. Anna Comnena refers to the people of Paristrion as "mixobarbaroi", distinguished from the Scythians whom they nevertheless shared language with. The term also came to be used by many contemporary authors in the aftermath of the Turkish Invasions of Anatolia, primarily in reference to the offspring of Turkish men with native Chrisitan women. Speros Vryonis has commented that the 'Mixovarvaroi' were considerable in number by the early 12th century and, whilst evidence suggests that these offspring often spoke Greek as well as Turkish, the majority were of the Muslim faith and considered themselves to be Turks. Over time this phenomenon played a part in the reduction of the Christian population and the Islamification and Turkification of Anatolia:

"In the long run their (mixovarvaroi) appearance in Anatolia resulted in a process that favoured the growth of the Muslim population at the expense of the Christian population, because Muslim society dominated politically and militarily. It is interesting, but unprofitable, to speculate about what would have happened to the Anatolian mixovarvaroi under different political circumstances."

The term mixo-barbarous refers to the writing language of Modern Greek that was characterized with Hellenic phrases, ancient syntax and overall ancient mimic but combined with modern and foreign etymology applied to the vulgar dialect used by Greeks during and after the fall of Constantinople.

References

Greek words and phrases
Exonyms
Demonyms
Hellenistic period
Multiracial affairs in Europe